Costa da Morte ("Death Coast") is part of the Galician coast. The Costa da Morte extends from the villages of Muros and Malpica.

The Costa da Morte received its name because there have been so many shipwrecks along its treacherous rocky shore. The shore of the Costa da Morte is exposed directly to the Atlantic Ocean. It is an area that has suffered a number of oil spills, including the spill from the Prestige in 2002.

The exterior cape region is known for anthropological, historical and geographical reasons. Its name in the Galician language is Fisterra, which descends from  the Roman legend which held that this area was the end of the world (Finis-terrae). The area was largely  Christianized by the Catholic Church with the aid of a large flux of Christian pilgrims arriving on the Way of St. James.

The people of the area still preserve pre-Christian ritual places and pass on some of the traditional beliefs. For example, there are giant pedras de abalar (i.e. "oscillating stones", the common term in English is rocking stone) throughout the region. These pedras de abalar were sacred locations and used in various rituals that are remembered in local culture. There is also a local legend that the wind creates wild nightmares.

Major commercial and fishing ports 
 A Coruña 
 Malpica 
 Camariñas 
 Muxia 
 Fisterra

Geography 
The Costa da Morte includes Cape Finisterre (Spanish: Cabo Finisterre; Galician: Cabo Fisterra), a rock-bound peninsula in the uttermost west of Galicia, Spain.

Cape Finisterre is not the westernmost point of Spain, contrary to popular belief. This title belongs to Cape Touriñán, which is found just north of Finisterre.  Finisterre's name, like that of Finistère in France, derives from the Latin Finisterrae which literally means "Land's End". This name was born several centuries ago, when Spanish people used to think that the Cape Finisterre was the place where the Earth ends, since they didn`t know about the American continent.

Cape Finisterre has a notable lighthouse on it, and the seaside town of Fisterra is located nearby.

Nevertheless, Cape finisterre is not the only cape that Costa da Morte includes; one can also see Cape Touriñán as well as Cape Vilán.

Further north are the Rías Altas.

Locations
These are some of the towns, villages, hamlets and cities along the "Costa da Morte":

 Suevos
 Caión
 Praia de Baldaio
 Punta do Razo
 Punta Falcoeira
 Malpica
 Illas Sisargas
 Barizo
 Punta de Nariga
 Corme
 Balarés
 Ria de Laxe
 Cabo de Laxe
 Praia de Traba
 Camelle
 Praia do Trece
 Cabo Vilán
 Camariñas
 Muxia
 Punta da Barca
 Cabo Touriñán
 Nemiña
 Ria de Lires
 Praia do Rostro
 Cabo da Nave
 Fisterra
 O viso

See also 
 Rías Altas
 Rías Baixas
 Costa do Marisco

References

Green Spain
Beaches of Galicia (Spain)
Tourism in Spain
Landforms of Galicia (Spain)
Morte
Coasts of the Atlantic Ocean